William Waters may refer to:

William Waters (mayor) (died 1881), mayor in Nelson, New Zealand
William Waters (architect), American architect
 W. F. Waters (1897–1968), Victorian Rover Scouting notable in Australia
Joe Waters (musician) (William Joseph Waters, 1947–2008), American country music singer
 Billy Waters (busker) (c. 1778–1823), black man who busked in London
 Billy Waters (footballer, born 1994), English football forward
 Billy Waters (footballer, born 1931), Welsh football goalkeeper

See also
William Walters (disambiguation)